Higher Power is the debut studio album of Canadian band The Dirty Nil. It was released on February 26, 2016, by Dine Alone Records. The only single from Higher Power, "No Weaknesses", was released on November 6, 2015. Music videos have been produced for "No Weaknesses", "Zombie Eyed", "Wrestle Yü To Hüsker Dü" and "Friends in the Sky".

Track listing

Personnel
The Dirty Nil
Luke Bentham – lead vocals, guitar
David Nardi – bass, vocals, backing vocals
Kyle Fischer – drums

Others
John Goodmanson – mixing
Dave Schiffman – recording, mixing
Josh Korody, Jordan Mitchell – additional production
Troy Glessner – mastering
Alex Roulette – cover painting
Yoshi Cooper - photos
David Nardi - design and layout

References

2016 debut albums
The Dirty Nil albums
Dine Alone Records albums